Madurai North is a legislative assembly constituency in the Indian state of Tamil Nadu. It is one of the 234 State Legislative Assembly Constituencies in Tamil Nadu, in India.

Elections and Winners from this constituency are listed below.

Extent of Assembly Constituency
Madurai South Taluk (Part).
Madurai (M Corp.) Ward No.2 to 8, 11 to 15 and 17 to 20.
Madurai North Taluk (Part)
Melamadai (CT).

Members of Legislative assembly

Election results

2021

2016

2011

1952

References 

Assembly constituencies of Tamil Nadu
Madurai
Politics of Madurai
Government of Madurai